Hemming Emil Hansen (May 2, 1884 – September 2, 1964) was a Danish boxer who competed in the 1908 Summer Olympics. He was born in Kværkeby, Zealand and died in Frederiksberg.

In 1908 he was eliminated in the first round of the lightweight class after losing his fight to the upcoming bronze medalist Harry Johnson.

References

External links

1884 births
1964 deaths
Lightweight boxers
Olympic boxers of Denmark
Boxers at the 1908 Summer Olympics
Danish male boxers
People from Ringsted Municipality
Sportspeople from Region Zealand